The  (RMF) is an international summer music festival in Germany, founded in 1987. It is mostly for classical music, but includes other genres. Concerts take place at culturally important locations, such as Eberbach Abbey and Schloss Johannisberg, in the wine-growing Rheingau region between Wiesbaden and Lorch.

Initiative and realisation 

The festival was the initiative of Michael Herrmann, who has served as its Artistic Director and chief executive officer. Like the Schleswig-Holstein Musik Festival founded in 1986, the Rheingau festival was intended to add life to a region rich in musical heritage. The gothic church of Kiedrich houses the oldest playable organ in Germany and has its own "dialect" of Gregorian chant that dates back to 1333.

To test the festival idea, two concerts took place in Eberbach Abbey in the summer of 1987. The association organized the festival from the first season in 1988 which included 19 concerts until 1992. It has continued to support the festival since. The RMF receives significant financial help from sponsors who choose to fund their own concerts.

The  is under the patronage of the minister-president of Hesse. Michael Herrmann was awarded the Goethe-Plakette of Hesse in 2002.

The RMF has grown to be one of Germany's important festivals presenting around 140 events every summer with international orchestras, ensembles and soloists. It is a member of the European Festivals Association. For the 2023 season, 164 concerts at 29 locations were announced.

On 17 June 2012, the 25th anniversary of the festival was celebrated at the Kurhaus, Wiesbaden.

Locations 

Concerts have been staged in churches such as St. Jakobus, Rüdesheim, castles and former presshouses.

Program 
Most events are dedicated to classical music, but cabaret, jazz, readings, musical cruises, children's concerts, wine tastings or culinary events with music add to a diverse program.

Opening concert 
The  is traditionally opened in Eberbach Abbey by a concert of the hr-Sinfonieorchester, broadcast live. The first concert was on 23 June 1988 a performance of two works by C. P. E. Bach, his Magnificat and the oratorio Die Israeliten in der Wüste. Frieder Bernius conducted the Kammerchor Stuttgart and the Barockorchester Stuttgart, with soloists Nancy Argenta, Lena Lootens, Mechthild Georg, Howard Crook and Stephen Roberts. A cycle of the symphonies of Gustav Mahler, conducted by Paavo Järvi, continued in 2011 with the Fifth Symphony, programmed with Alban Berg's Sieben frühe Lieder, sung by Elena Garanca. In 2013, Mahler's Sixth Symphony was preceded by Wagner's Wesendonck Lieder, sung by Anne Sofie von Otter. In 2016, Christoph Eschenbach conducted Schubert's Unfinished Symphony and Bruckner's Sixth Symphony The 2019 festival was opened by Dvořák's Stabat Mater, with the MDR Rundfunkchor and the hr Sinfonieorchester conducted by Andrés Orozco-Estrada.

The 2020 festival had to be cancelled due to the COVID-19 pandemic. The 2021 festival was opened on 26 June, traditionally by the hr-Sinfonieorchester, and as the last program with Orozco-Estrada. Due to restrictions, the 650 listeners were placed like a checker board, 2 seats taken, and 2 seats empty; the program was played without intermission. Augustin Hadelich was the soloist in the Violin Concerto by Jean Sibelius, which was followed by Mendelssohn's Reformation Symphony. The concert was at the same time a charity concert of President Frank-Walter Steinmeier who spoke at the beginning with a focus on the support and encouragement of music students to follow their calling even in critical times. After the concert, he invited to a reception at various areas of the property, addressing each group there.

The opening concert in 2023 is focused on French music with the Te Deum by Berlioz as the focus, conducted by Alain Altinoglu.

Anniversaries 
Every year, composers' anniversaries are celebrated. In 2009, six concerts were given each to music by Handel, including Israel in Egypt with the Monteverdi Choir under John Eliot Gardiner; by Haydn, including The Creation conducted by Enoch zu Guttenberg; and by Mendelssohn, including Elijah with the Collegium Vocale Gent under Philippe Herreweghe.

2014 remembers three anniversaries of birth, 450 of Shakespeare, 300 of C.P.E. Bach and 150 of Richard Strauss.

Theme 

Every year, some concerts are grouped around a theme; in 2010, in eight concerts, including one of the ensemble amarcord, in 2011 the opposite: .

The theme of 2016,  (Strong women), was expressed in a concert of Mad Songs of the time of English restoration, performed by Dorothee Mields and the Lautten Compagney, combining folk songs and art songs mostly by Henry Purcell.

In 2023, the festival announced themes including works by Gustav Mahler, Bach's Goldberg Variations and Stravinsky's Le Sacre du Printemps, both these works in several interpretations.

Treffpunkt Jugend 
Soloists still in their teens are presented at the regular series  (meeting point youth). They play in two Marathon concerts chamber music and concertos with orchestra.

Work cycles 
Some performances are presented over several years, such as the piano sonatas of Ludwig van Beethoven by Rudolf Buchbinder. From 2003 to 2011, Eliahu Inbal conducted a series of the complete symphonies of Bruckner at Eberbach Abbey with the WDR Symphony Orchestra Cologne, concluding with the unfinished Ninth Symphony.

Marienvesper 
In 2011 the ensemble Concerto Romano, conducted by Alessandro Quarta, performed a combination of works by composers from Rome, Vincenzo Ugolini, Paolo Tarditi (c.1580–1661), Domenico Massenzio (d.1650, ""), and in particular Lorenzo Ratti (c.1589–1630). In 2013 Monteverdi's Vespers were performed again, this time by the ensemble amarcord with additional singers, and the Lautten Compagney conducted by Wolfgang Katschner.

Organ concert 
Organ concerts have been played on the historic instruments of the region by organists such as Marie Claire Alain, Gabriel Dessauer, Edgar Krapp and Ignace Michiels.

Rendezvous 
In 2010 a new series started, presenting artists before their concerts in a separate : Christoph Eschenbach, the percussionist Martin Grubinger and Menahem Pressler. The guests in 2011 were Andreas Scholl and Christian Gerhaher.

Portraits of living composers 
A special feature of the RMF is the annual , the presentation of a living composer in talk and music. It was initiated by Walter Fink and has been sponsored by him. From the beginning in 1990 the core of this portrait has been the invitation of a composer for an interview with chamber music. The modern ESWE Atrium was a fitting venue, but since a larger audience got interested the talks were moved to Schloss Johannisberg. In later years more concerts were added, sometimes in different locations, sometimes showing the works of the featured composer in relation to other music, concentrating on large scale works since 2005. Some composers have played or conducted themselves.

Songs by Wolfgang Rihm on texts by Goethe were performed, juxtaposed with Goethe-settings by Schubert, by Christian Gerhaher and Gerold Huber on 3 August 2014, just before a performance at the Salzburg Festival. They included the second performance of Harzreise.

Composers in residence 
 2013 Fazıl Say
 2014 Jörg Widmann
 2015 Lera Auerbach

He introduced to the pieces and after each work answered questions from the audience. In two sonatas composed in 2012, with Turkish place names as movement titles, he played the piano, first a cello sonata in four movements, then a clarinet sonata in three movements, both including elements of Turkish music as well as jazz. The program ended with his wind quintet Op. 31.

In the workshop, he presented four of his chamber music works, playing in two of them, Fieberphantasie for string quartet, clarinet and piano, and a quintet for piano and winds, the scoring of Mozart's quintet K. 452. The other works were Air for horn solo, and the String Quartet No. 3 Jagdquartett.

The composer in residence of 2015 was Lera Auerbach, who performed her works as a pianist in several concerts, including a Werkstattkonzert (workshop concert) of chamber music with students of the Frankfurt Musikhochschule.

Artists in residence 
 2013 Sol Gabetta
 2014 Frank Peter Zimmermann
 2016 Isabelle Faust
 2017 Igor Levit
 2018 Annette Dasch
 2019 Daniil Trifonov
 2020 Cancellation Rheingau Musik Festival 2020
 2021 Khatia Buniatishvili
 2023 Sarah Willis, Daniel Hope, Sol Gabetta (again), Martin Grubinger

In 2017, two pianists were artists in residence, Igor Levit and Michael Wollny, who both played several concerts. Wollny invited for a concert at the Kurhaus Wiesbaden the vocalist Andreas Schaerer, the saxophonist Émile Parisien and the accordionist Vincent Peirani.

Closing choral concert 
The festival usually concludes with a choral concert in Eberbach Abbey, including rarely performed works. In 2005 Frieder Bernius conducted Penderecki's Polish Requiem, Helmuth Rilling conducted  in 2001 and works entitled Messiah by both Sven-David Sandström and Handel in 2009.

Artists 

Artists have included Anne-Sophie Mutter, Alfred Brendel, Mstislav Rostropovitch, the Alban Berg Quartet, Zubin Mehta, and Riccardo Muti. Dietrich Fischer-Dieskau has appeared as a recitator, and Giora Feidman and Bobby McFerrin included their audience in their performance. In 2001, Dave Brubeck and his quartet appeared with the Jacques Loussier Trio. Chick Corea visited in 2009 and jammed with Roy Haynes, whose band had opened the concert. Other artists of 2009 included Colin Davis, Ludwig Güttler, Martha Argerich, Frank Peter Zimmermann, Anne Sofie von Otter and Olga Scheps. Lorin Maazel conducted the Vienna Philharmonic in Bruckner's Symphony No. 3 and Stravinsky's .

In 2011, the Thomanerchor sang a concert of mostly motets, including Bach's  in Eberbach Abbey, part of the choir's tour in its 800th year. Andreas Scholl, born in the Rheingau, made his debut at the festival in three events, an interview, a trip to three churches with different concert programs, and an opera recital with his sister Elisabeth in Eberbach Abbey. The Lautten Compagney performed in concert Handel's opera Rinaldo, 300 years after its premiere. The ensemble Le Concert Spirituel, conducted by Hervé Niquet, performed music for up to 40 voices by Alessandro Striggio, together with music of Orazio Benevoli, Francesco Corteccia, Stefano Fabbri and Claudio Monteverdi. Other artists of 2011 included Freddy Cole, Yo-Yo Ma, Mitsuko Uchida, Waltraud Meier, Sabine Meyer, Heinrich Schiff, Frank Peter Zimmermann, Arabella Steinbacher, Daniel Müller-Schott, Xavier de Maistre, Omara Portuondo, Dianne Reeves, Nils Landgren, The King's Singers, the Münchner Philharmoniker with Olli Mustonen and Herbert Blomstedt, and the Windsbacher Knabenchor, among others.

In 2013, Andris Nelsons conducted the City of Birmingham Symphony Orchestra with soloist Sol Gabetta in a program including Elgar's Cello Concerto and Dvořák's Eighth Symphony.

In 2014, Maurizio Pollini made his debut at the festival, playing in the Kurhaus Wiesbaden Chopin's  Preludes (Op. 28) and Book 1 of Debussy's Preludes.

25 years in 2012 

Other themes of the anniversary season were "" (Festive Music), "" (Violin Circle) and "" (Organ Dimensions). The music was juxtaposed to Monteverdi's , with James Gilchrist.

Rheingau Musikpreis 
In 1994 the festival initiated the  that has been awarded annually for musical achievements, to

 1994 Volker David Kirchner, composer
 1995 Alexander L. Ringer, musicologist
 1996 Gidon Kremer, violinist
 1997 ensemble recherche, chamber ensemble for contemporary music
 1998 Toshio Hosokawa, composer
 1999 Tabea Zimmermann, viola player
 2000 Helmuth Rilling, chorale conductor
 2001 Artemis Quartet, string quartet
 2002 , actor, cabarettist, comedian
 2003 Stefan-Peter Greiner, violin maker
 2004 , Society for music in medicine
 2005 Niki Reiser, composer of film music
 2006 Hugh Wolff, conductor
 2007 Windsbacher Knabenchor, boys choir
 2008 Heinz Holliger, oboist and composer
 2009 Christian Gerhaher, baritone
 2010 , opera company
 2011 , musical comedians
 2012 Lautten Compagney, ensemble
 2013 Fazıl Say, pianist and composer
 2014 Christoph Eschenbach, conductor
 2015 Andreas Scholl, singer
 2016 Walter Renneisen, actor
 2017 Enoch zu Guttenberg, conductor, and Chorgemeinschaft Neubeuern, choir
 2018 Yannick Nézet-Séguin, conductor
 2019 Deutsche Kammerphilharmonie Bremen, orchestra, and Paavo Järvi, conductor
 2020 Daniel Barenboim and West–Eastern Divan Orchestra
 2021 Nils Landgren
 2022 Herbert Blomstedt

Broadcast and recordings 
Many concerts have been conducted in collaboration with broadcasting stations, namely Hessischer Rundfunk. Selected events were recorded, including:

 Beethoven: Sonate f-moll, Schumann: Kreisleriana, Rachmaninoff: Prèludes et Etudes, Andreas Haefliger, 1994
 Canzoni & Concerti of Girolamo Frescobaldi, Claudio Monteverdi, Antonio Vivaldi, George Frideric Handel – Guillemette Laurens, Il Giardino Armonico, 1995
 Tschaikovsky: Manfred Symphony, Saint Petersburg Philharmonic Orchestra, conductor Yuri Temirkanov, live in Kurhaus Wiesbaden, 1997
 Dvořák: Biblical Songs op. 99, New World Symphony – Liliana Bizineche-Eisinger, Kölner Rundfunk-Sinfonie-Orchester, conductor: Gerd Albrecht, live in Kurhaus Wiesbaden, 1997
 Haydn: The Seasons, Anna Korondi, Markus Schäfer, Dietrich Henschel, Chorgemeinschaft Neubeuern; Orchester der KlangVerwaltung München, Enoch zu Guttenberg, Eberbach Abbey, 30 July 1998
 Charles Gounod: Mors et Vita, Barbara Frittoli, Lidia Tirendi, Zoran Todorovich, Davide Damiani, Budapest Radio Choir, hr-Sinfonieorchester, Marcello Viotti, 4 July 1999, Eberbach Abbey
 Carl Orff  – Annette Dasch, Gert Henning-Jensen, Zeljko Lucic, Orfeón Donostiarra, hr-Sinfonieorchester, conductor: Hugh Wolff, live in Eberbach Abbey, 2002
 Mahler: Symphony No. 2, Brigitte Geller, Iris Vermillion, Festival Chor und Orchester Stuttgart, Helmuth Rilling, 30 August 2003, Eberbach Abbey
 Handel: Messiah, Anna Korondi, Annette Markert, Werner Güra, Sebastian Noack, Cappella Istropolitana, Choir of the Bamberger Symphony, Rolf Beck, Eberbach Abbey, 21 August 2004
 Mozart: Great Mass in C minor, Version of Robert D. Levin, Diana Damrau, Juliane Banse, Lothar Odinius, Markus Marquardt, Gächinger Kantorei, Bach-Collegium Stuttgart, Helmuth Rilling, 2006
 Mahler: Symphony No. 3, Waltraud Meier, Limburger Domsingknaben, MDR Rundfunkchor, hr-Sinfonieorchester, Paavo Järvi, Eberbach Abbey, 23 June 2007
 Unergründliches Geheimnis (Enigmatic Secret), Sacred choral music of Brahms, Bruckner, Mendelssohn and Reger, Windsbacher Knabenchor, Marktkirche Wiesbaden, 18 July 2008
 Rheingau Musik Festival 2009, Best of Vol. III, Baiba Skride, Nikolaj Znaider, Alfredo Perl, Xavier de Maistre, Christian Gerhaher, Windsbacher Knabenchor, 2009

References

External links 

 
 Entries for Rheingau Musik Festival on WorldCat, recordings, books and articles
 
 Rheingau Musik Festival mit 86 Prozent Auslastung (in German) musik-heute.de 3 September 2021

Music festivals established in 1987
Classical music festivals in Germany
1987 establishments in West Germany
Rheingau